Half-senate elections were held in Australia on 9 May 1953. 32 of the seats in the Senate were up for election. This was the first time a Senate election had been held without an accompanying election of the House of Representatives. The two election cycles fell out of synchronisation after the 1951 double dissolution. While the term of the House was not due to expire until 1954, a Senate election was due by 1 July 1953.

Although the Australian Labor Party won a majority of the contested seats, the Liberal-Country Coalition retained a majority of the overall seats in the upper house.

See also

 Candidates of the Australian Senate election, 1953
 Members of the Australian Senate, 1953–1956

References

University of WA  election results in Australia since 1890

Federal elections in Australia
1953 elections in Australia
May 1953 events in Australia